The Small Glories is a Canadian folk duo from Winnipeg composed of Cara Luft and J.D. Edwards, both of whom perform on guitar and vocals.

History

Luft and Edwards first played together in 2012, when both played a 25th-anniversary show for the West End Cultural Centre in Winnipeg, and in 2014, Edwards played with Luft on her solo tour. Soon after this, they began recording as a duo, and in 2016, their debut as the Small Glories, entitled Wondrous Traveler, was released.

For their second album, the duo worked with producer Neil Osborne, who was a member of 54-40.

They signed to Red House Records to release the album, entitled Assiniboine & the Red, in 2019.

Discography
Wondrous Traveler (Self-released, 2016)
Assiniboine & the Red (Red House Records, 2019)

References

Canadian Folk Music Award winners
Canadian folk music groups
Musical groups from Winnipeg